Sir Mansel Aylward CB MD DSc FFOM FCRP FLSW (born November 1942, Merthyr Tydfil) is a Welsh public health physician and academic. He was Chief Medical Officer, Medical Director and Chief Scientist at the U.K. Government Department for Work and Pensions.

He was Director of the Centre for Psychosocial Research, Occupational and Physician Health at Cardiff University School of Medicine. He was knighted in the 2010 New Year Honours for services to health and healthcare. He was made a Freeman of the Borough of Merthyr Tydfil in 2013 and elected to the fellowship of the Learned Society of Wales in 2016.

He was the first Chair of Public Health Wales NHS Trust from 2009 a 2017, responsible for the delivery of public health services at national, local and community levels in Wales. He is currently the Chair (Emeritus) of the Bevan Commission.

Early life and education
He was born in the Ex-servicemen's Club in Merthyr Tydfil in November 1942.

Career
From 1996 to April 2005, Aylward was Chief Medical Adviser, Medical Director and Chief Scientist of the UK Department for Work and Pensions and Chief Medical Adviser and Head of Profession at the Veteran's Agency, Ministry of Defence.  He was on the board of the Benefits Agency Medical Service in the 1990s.

Aylward's wife, Angela, was then involved in setting up a company called Mediprobe, trading under the name Nationwide Medical Examination Advisory Service Ltd, which arranged for the agency's doctors to work for insurance companies.  

He was involved in the establishment of the new Work Capability Assessment test. When he left the department he headed the UnumProvident Centre for Psychosocial and Disability Research, at Cardiff University,

Aylward has been criticized for giving academic credibility to the biopsychosocial model which was said to be the basis of the Cameron government’s disability benefits crackdown.

He is Chair of the advisory board of HCB Group, a provider of rehabilitation and case management services to insurance companies and the corporate sector.

Aylward is chair (emeritus) of the Bevan Commission, a group of international experts which advises the Welsh Minister for Health and Social Services.

He was Chair of Life Sciences Hub Wales from 2017-21. He remains on the Board of Directors.

Publications
 Managing long-term worklessness in primary care: a focus group study, Cohen D, Marfell N, Webb K, Robling M, Aylward M, Occup Med (Lond), Volume 60, 2 (March 2010) pp. 121–126
 Models of Sickness and Disability Applied to Common Health Problems, Waddell G et al., Royal Society of Medicine Press (2010)
 The Power of Belief: psychosocial influences on illness, disability and medicine, Edited by Halligan P W and Aylward M
 Beliefs: Clinical and vocational interventions; tackling psychological and social determinants of illness and disability, Edited by Halligan PW and Aylward M Oxford University Press (2006)
 The Scientific and Conceptual Basis of Incapacity Benefits, Gordon Waddell and Mansel Aylward, The Stationery Office 2005

References

External links
 Cardiff University

21st-century Welsh medical doctors
Knights Bachelor
British public health doctors
Civil servants in the Department for Work and Pensions
Living people
1942 births